Philipp Keel (*1968) is a Swiss artist, author, filmmaker and publisher.

Philipp Keel studied piano at Berklee College of Music in Boston and directing at the University of Television and Film Munich. He lived in Los Angeles and worked there as an artist, author and director. His book series All About Me and Keel's Simple Diary have reached a total circulation of around 4 million copies until today and made him famous worldwide. His photo book Color shaped a new photographic style that gives a different dimension to the everyday.

In 2012, Philipp Keel succeeded his father Daniel Keel as publisher of Diogenes and in 2016 founded Diogenes Entertainment, for which he produces international film and television projects. Since 2019, he has been the sole owner of Diogenes Verlag AG. He received the ›Premio Enrico Filippini‹ for his work as a publisher in 2022.

With the drawings and paintings from the Jakob and Philipp Keel collection, he repeatedly initiates museum exhibitions.

Philipp Keel lives in Zurich.

Work and reception

Philipp Keel's artistic oeuvre includes photographs, drawings, watercolors, oil paintings and silkscreen prints. His art is shown in numerous international exhibitions and is represented in leading collections.

As a photographic artist, he is an intuitive conqueror of the moment. "Leaves floating on water cast shadows, white women's legs dive into a pool, the heat of the Sierra Nevada flickers outside a car window, a luminous Ferris wheel vibrates."

All the images are united by an eye for special details and moods. Keel alters reality through alienation or reduction. He captures the magical in the everyday and seeks the world behind the world. "My photography should be honest and direct like a dream, that is my claim." "Signals and signs that mean something are there every day. I take great pleasure in linking the things I see and experience and putting them together anew, like a puzzle that makes sense only to me."

While a photograph can be created quickly, Keel's image processing in the lab often takes many months. Working with Don Weinstein, one of the most renowned photo printers in the US, and with Epson, Keel developed what he calls the ›Imbue Print‹ over a period of years.

His artistic work is inspired by David Hockney, Saul Steinberg, Henri Matisse, Tomi Ungerer, Irving Penn, Richard Alvedon and Saul Leiter.

The art of his mother Anna Keel, who was a painter and draughtswoman, also had a strong influence on him.

"I hang unfinished works on the wall and mark the places that still need work. Then I let time pass. It's never wrong to take a moment to think about what you're doing."

Of his watercolour work, Keel said. "What counts here is the pace (...). Watercolours demand discipline, detachment and precision. With oil painting there is turpentine, with photography the next print, but with watercolour there is only the moment."

Keel often works serially and usually deals with certain motifs and themes over several years. In doing so, the different forms of expression in his art often inspire each other.

"You can't become an artist any more than you can become musical," Keel says. An old-fashioned adage guides him: practice makes perfect. He himself laments his lack of patience, calling this lack the "muse of my madness."

Keel believes that there is too much of everything. "The weariness of the virtual world, which ruins everything, leads to a new longing for the classical. Making limited use of the endless possibilities is the great challenge."

"What fascinates me even more than illusion, mystery, philosophy and inspiration is the passion that drives us to do exactly what we do best."

Solo exhibitions (selection) 

 Last Summer, Bildhalle, Zurich, 2019
 Reasons and Seasons, Villa Flor, S-chanf, 2018
 Paintings, Drawings and Photographs, Apalazzogallery, Brescia, 2018
 Splash, Bildhalle, Zurich, 2017
 State of Mind, Villa Flor, S-chanf, 2014
 Splash, Camera Work, Berlin, 2013
 Tokyo Photo 5, Tokyo, 2013
 AISA – Images of an Imaginary Continent, Galerie Judin, Zurich, 2005
 Paintings, Sculptures & Photography, Charim Galerie, Vienna, 2003
 Color, Ruth Bachofner Gallery, Santa Monica, 2002
 Imbue Prints, Galerie Zur Stockeregg & Art 32 Basel, Zurich, 2001

Group exhibitions (selection) 

 Fernweh, Bildhalle, Zurich, 2020
 Fly Me to the Moon, Kunsthaus Zürich, Zurich, 2019
 Photography on a Postcard, Photo London, Somerset House, London, 2019
 People at Art, artgenève, Centre de la photographie Genève, Genève 2017
 Empire II, 57th Venice Biennale, Venice, 2017
 Photo Shanghai, Shanghai Exhibition Center, Shanghai, 2014
 Paris Photo, Grand Palais, Paris, 2013
 People and Places with No Name, Ace Gallery, Los Angeles, 2002
 California Dreaming, Libera Accademia di Belle Arti, Brescia, 2002
 Details, Faces & Abstracts, DJR International Art, New York, 2001
 L.A. Nude 5, Photo Impact, Los Angeles, 2000

Publications (selection) 

 Last Summer, Steidl 2021
 Apalazzo Gazzetta, Apalazzogallery 2018
 Splash, Steidl 2015
 State of Mind, Nieves 2014
 Keel´s Simple Diary, volume two, Taschen 2011
 Keel´s Simple Diary, volume one, Taschen 2009
 AISA – Images from an Imaginary Continent, Edition Judin 2005
 Color, Steidl 2003
 All About Us, Broadway Books 2000
 Look at Me, Edition Stemmle / Abrams Books 1999
 All About Me, Broadway Books 1998

References

External links
  Philipp Keel Book Listing on ISNDB
  Taschen
  Steidl
 Diogenes
  Interview with Daniel Keel
  Broadway Books
  All About Me in NYT Magazine
  Philipp Keel in ARTnews
  Philipp Keel
  Simple Diary
  CAMERA WORK

Swiss writers
Living people
1968 births